"Brasil" is a song by English musician Ed O'Brien, released under the stage name EOB. It was released on 5 December 2019 as the lead single from O'Brien's debut album Earth.

Background 
"Brasil" was initially recorded in 2013 with producer Ian Davenport. It was rerecorded several times with various producers until the final version, produced by Flood and mixed by Alan Moulder, was recorded in January 2019. It was the final track on Earth to be completed. The song features O'Brien's Radiohead bandmate Colin Greenwood on bass, as well as drums by Omar Hakim.

Composition 
Chris DeVille of Stereogum described the song as "a nine-minute shapeshifting epic" and "sweeping motorik pop-rock" with "plaintive guitar arpeggios" and "a bit closer to a conventional rock sound" than O'Brien's Radiohead bandmate Thom Yorke's 2019 solo album Anima. Ben Kaye of Consequence of Sound stated that "'Brasil' opens as a somewhat bucolic acoustic piece, with O’Brien’s mournful guitar and voice leading the way as strings slowly dance above them. The pace begins to quicken a third of the way through, however, as Hakim’s drumming and Greenwood’s bass make themselves known. From there, the song becomes a pulsing motorik driver that beats out into space."

Music video 
The music video was written and directed by Andrew Donoho.

Discussing the video's concept, O'Brien stated:

Donoho said:

References 

2019 singles
2019 songs
Songs written by Ed O'Brien
Song recordings produced by Flood (producer)
British pop rock songs